Epiphane P. Nadeau (December 27, 1879 – November 27, 1943) was a Canadian politician. He served in the Legislative Assembly of New Brunswick from 1939 to his death in 1943 as member of the Liberals.

References 

1879 births
1943 deaths